Frédéric Chopin’s waltzes are pieces of moderate length adhering to the traditional 3/4 waltz time, but are remarkably different from the earlier Viennese waltzes in that they were not designed for dancing but for concert performance.  Some of them are accessible by pianists of moderate capabilities, but the more difficult of them require an advanced technique.  Carl Maria von Weber's Invitation to the Dance was an early model for Chopin's waltzes.
 
Chopin started writing waltzes in 1824, when he was fourteen, and continued until the year of his death, 1849.  He wrote 36 in total, of which 20 are numbered.

Probably the most famous are the Minute Waltz in D-flat major and the C-sharp minor waltz of 1847, two of the last set of waltzes Chopin published before his death (Op. 64).

Background
Chopin published only eight waltzes in his lifetime, and his desire was that any unpublished works would not be published and instead burned.
However, Chopin's sister Ludwika and Julian Fontana decided to publish the waltzes 9-13. Another six waltzes (composed 1826-1831), present in the Paris home, were preserved but later destroyed in a fire in 1863 in Ludwika's house. Publication of the waltzes 14-19 occurred later. Chopin had given them to related persons and had not guarded the manuscripts.

The waltzes include a piece that was untitled; it is in 3/4 time with the tempo indication Sostenuto, and it has some of the characteristics of a waltz, so it is often (but not universally) catalogued with the waltzes. (In addition, the last variation of his Variations on a German Air, op. posth., is in the form of a waltz.)

In addition, there remain:
 Extant waltzes in private hands and unavailable to researchers.
 Waltzes believed destroyed.
 Waltzes believed lost.
 Waltzes of which documentary evidence exists but the MSS are not known to be extant.

List of waltzes by or attributed to Chopin

See also
 List of compositions by Frédéric Chopin by genre
 List of compositions by Frédéric Chopin by opus number

Notes

References

 
Music with dedications